Inspire Brands, Inc. is an American holding company and the owner and franchisor of the Arby's, Buffalo Wild Wings, Sonic Drive-In, Jimmy John's, Mister Donut, Dunkin' Donuts and Baskin-Robbins restaurant chains. Inspire operates Support Centers in Atlanta, Oklahoma City, Champaign, Minneapolis, and Canton, Massachusetts. Inspire Brands is majority-owned by affiliates of Roark Capital Group.

History 
Inspire Brands was formed when Arby's Restaurant Group merged with Buffalo Wild Wings on February 5, 2018. Buffalo Wild Wings also owned the Rusty Taco chain. Arby's CEO Paul Brown was selected to continue as Inspire Brands CEO. Brown expected that Inspire would acquire additional chains in different segments. He plans to structure the company similar to Hilton Hotels & Resorts. Co-owner The Wendy's Company's stake was reduced from 18.5% to 12.3% due to the infusion of capital from Roark Capital to fund the purchase. In September 2018, Inspire had the 27-location R Taco reverted to the Rusty Taco name.

On August 16, 2018, The Wendy's Company announced that it sold its 12.3% stake in Inspire Brands back to the company for $450 million, which included a 38% premium over the stake's most recent valuation. On August 28, 2018, Georgia Governor Nathan Deal announced that Inspire was moving its headquarters to Sandy Springs, Georgia in 2019.

Inspire Brands on September 25, 2018 announced that it was buying Oklahoma City-based Sonic Drive-In for $2.3 billion. The acquisition was completed on December 7, 2018.

Inspire Brands announced that it was buying Jimmy John's on September 25, 2019. The deal closed on October 18, 2019. 

Inspire Brands on October 25, 2020 announced that it was buying Dunkin' Brands for $11.3 billion.
 The acquisition was completed on December 15, 2020.

On December 19, 2022, Inspire Brands announced that it had sold Rusty Taco to Gala Capital Partners, owner of Cicis Pizza, Dunn Brothers Coffee, and Mooyah.

Inspire received Franchise Times’ 2019 Dealmaker of the Year award for its acquisitions of Buffalo Wild Wings and Sonic Drive-In.

Brands
As of Dec 2022, the chains that the company owns and/or operates include: 

Arby's
Baskin-Robbins
Buffalo Wild Wings
Dunkin' Donuts
Jimmy John's
Mister Donut (international)
Sonic Drive-In

References

External links 
 

Companies based in Sandy Springs, Georgia
Fast-food chains of the United States
Fast-food franchises
Restaurant chains in the United States
Restaurant groups in the United States
2018 establishments in Georgia (U.S. state)
Economy of the Southeastern United States
American companies established in 2018
Restaurants established in 2018
Private equity portfolio companies